In mathematics, a path in a topological space  is a continuous function from the closed unit interval  into  

Paths play an important role in the fields of topology and mathematical analysis. 
For example, a topological space for which there exists a path connecting any two points is said to be path-connected. Any space may be broken up into path-connected components. The set of path-connected components of a space  is often denoted  

One can also define paths and loops in pointed spaces, which are important in homotopy theory.

Definition 

A curve in a topological space  is a continuous function  from a non-empty and non-degenerate interval  

Importantly, a path is not just a subset of  that "looks like" a curve, it also includes a parameterization. For example, the maps  and  represent two different paths from 0 to 1 on the real line. 

This is because  is the quotient space of  when  is identified with  The set of all loops in  forms a space called the loop space of

Homotopy of paths 

Paths and loops are central subjects of study in the branch of algebraic topology called homotopy theory. A homotopy of paths makes precise the notion of continuously deforming a path while keeping its endpoints fixed.

The paths  and  connected by a homotopy are said to be homotopic (or more precisely path-homotopic, to distinguish between the relation defined on all continuous functions between fixed spaces). One can likewise define a homotopy of loops keeping the base point fixed.

The relation of being homotopic is an equivalence relation on paths in a topological space. The equivalence class of a path  under this relation is called the homotopy class of  often denoted

Path composition 

One can compose paths in a topological space in the following manner. The path  is defined as the path obtained by first traversing  and then traversing :

Clearly path composition is only defined when the terminal point of  coincides with the initial point of  If one considers all loops based at a point  then path composition is a binary operation. 

Path composition, whenever defined, is not associative due to the difference in parametrization. However it  associative up to path-homotopy. That is,  Path composition defines a group structure on the set of homotopy classes of loops based at a point  in  The resultant group is called the fundamental group of  based at  usually denoted  

A path  of this kind has a length  defined as   Path composition is then defined as before with the following modification:

Fundamental groupoid 

There is a categorical picture of paths which is sometimes useful. Since any morphism in this category is an isomorphism this category is a groupoid, called the fundamental groupoid of  Loops in this category are the endomorphisms (all of which are actually automorphisms). More generally, one can define the fundamental groupoid on any subset  of  using homotopy classes of paths joining points of  This is convenient for the Van Kampen's Theorem.

See also 
 
 
 Path space (disambiguation)

References 

 Ronald Brown, Topology and groupoids, Booksurge PLC, (2006).
 J. Peter May, A concise course in algebraic topology, University of Chicago Press, (1999).
 James Munkres, Topology  2ed, Prentice Hall, (2000).

Topology
Homotopy theory